Danny Schmitz is an American baseball coach and former second baseman. He played college baseball at Eastern Michigan for coach Ron Oestrike from 1974 to 1977 before playing professionally from 1977 to 1984. He then served as an assistant coach at Eastern Michigan (1988–1990) before becoming the head baseball coach of the Bowling Green Falcons (1991–2020).

Playing career
Schmitz was a four-year letterman at second base for Eastern Michigan, which he helped to a pair of College World Series appearances including the 1976 final.  After his senior season, in which he batted .339 and served as a co-captain, he was drafted in the 20th round of the 1977 Major League Baseball Draft by the New York Yankees.  Schmitz would go on to play six seasons in the minors, reaching Class AAA in his second season but never reaching the majors.  He spent brief time in the New York Mets and Minnesota Twins systems, including a season as a player-coach with the Toledo Mud Hens before retiring and turning full-time to coaching.

Coaching career
Immediately after ending his playing career, he served as manager of the Twins' class-A affiliate Visalia Oaks.  He served in that position for three years before returning to Eastern Michigan as an assistant coach.  While back with the Hurons, he helped lead EMU to a pair of second-place finishes in 1988 and 1990.  He was hired at Bowling Green for his first head coaching job at the collegiate level, just the Falcons ninth coach and fifth since 1928.

While with Bowling Green, the Falcons have claimed four Mid-American Conference regular season titles, seven division titles, and three Mid-American Conference baseball tournament championships.  Schmitz has seen 29 players sign professional contracts, while his teams have amassed over 600 wins. Following the COVID-19 pandemic in 2020, Bowling Green State University announced the termination of the baseball program due to budget cuts during the pandemic, just weeks later, the school announced that it had fund-raised enough money to revive the program effective immediately. On June 3, 2020, it was announced that Schmitz would step down from head coach and step into an advisory role with the program.

Head coaching record
This table shows Schmitz's record as a college coach.

See also

References

Living people
1955 births
Sportspeople from Detroit
Baseball second basemen
Bowling Green Falcons baseball coaches
Columbus Clippers players
Eastern Michigan Eagles baseball coaches
Eastern Michigan Eagles baseball players
Fort Lauderdale Yankees players
Nashville Sounds players
Oneonta Yankees players
Tacoma Yankees players
Tidewater Tides players
Toledo Mud Hens players
West Haven Yankees players
Baseball players from Detroit